Pedro Sánchez Gamarra is the current Peruvian Minister of Energy and Mining under President Alan García since October 2008.

Biography
Pedro Sánchez Gamarra received a Master's degree from George Washington University in Washington, DC. He has been the Executive Director of COPRI, PROMCEPRI and SIDEC, and the Chairman of ELECTROPERU, ELECTROLIMA, EDEGEL, EGENOR, ETEVENSA, and Electro Sur Este.

References

Living people
George Washington University alumni
Government ministers of Peru
Year of birth missing (living people)